Minnesota 2020 is a non-partisan think tank created by ex-Minnesota Democratic–Farmer–Labor Party State Representative Matt Entenza in June 2007 in Minnesota, USA. Minnesota 2020 focuses on the issues of economic development, education, health care, transportation and other key issues. Minnesota 2020 ceased operations in 2014.

External links
 Official website

References

Political and economic think tanks in the United States
Think tanks established in 2007